Group N of the 2019 FIBA Basketball World Cup was the classification stage of the 2019 FIBA Basketball World Cup for four teams, bottom two teams from Group C and two from Group D. The results against the teams that also qualified were carried over. The teams played against the teams from the group they have not faced before, for a total of two games per team, with all games played at Wukesong Arena, Beijing. After all of the games were played, the first placed team was classified 17 to 20, the second placed team 21 to 24, the third placed team 25 to 28 and the fourth placed team 29 to 32.

Qualified teams

Standings

All times are local UTC+8.

Games

Angola vs. Iran

Tunisia vs. Philippines

Tunisia vs. Angola

Iran vs. Philippines

References

External links

2019 FIBA Basketball World Cup